Ashwin Kumar is an Indian television and film actor.

Career
In 2012, Ashwin finished working on a coming-of-age film titled Hi Da directed by Brindha Das, which had music composed by Vishal Chandrasekhar. Though the soundtrack and an official trailer were released, the film did not have a theatrical release. He then appeared in Radha Mohan's bilingual film Gouravam (2013), in both the Tamil and Telugu versions. In early 2013, he completed a film titled Ayul Regai Neeyadi, where he worked alongside a new technical team. Despite having an audio launch event, the film also failed to have a theatrical release. Vijay Sekar's Kaathal Kasakkuthaiya was also completed but unreleased. Another film titled Kalaintha Kanavugal by director Kabilan, examining the relationship between parents and their children, also failed to be completed. In 2013, Ashwin worked in the lead role in Rasu Jaganathan's Saranalayam co-starring actress Sri Priyanka. Upon completion, the film failed to find distributors and remained unreleased for five years. It later had a low-profile release across Tamil Nadu in February 2018, with a reviewer from Iflicks.com noting, "Ashwin Kumar plays the protagonist and has done a decent job".

Ashwin has enjoyed more success in television. His most high-profile work to date has been appearances in the lead role in the serials Thamarai and Kula Deivam since 2014 and 2015, respectively. In early 2017, he began work on the television serial Lakshmi Kalyanam as Kalyan, one of the lead roles.

Filmography

Television

Serials

References

Living people
Tamil male actors
Tamil male television actors
Television personalities from Tamil Nadu
Male actors from Tamil Nadu
Male actors in Tamil cinema
21st-century Tamil male actors
1987 births